The Ulster Chess Championship is an annual chess tournament organised by the Ulster Chess Union which has been held since 1892. It is currently open to all players who qualify as having been born in any of the 9 counties of Ulster. Nearly all Championships since 1982 have been played in Belfast. Among the winners in recent years have been two players, both also Irish Champions, who now have the title of International Master (IM), Mark Orr (4 times, most recently in 2001/02) and Brian Kelly (1994/95). Recent winners are Michael Waters (4 times)Stephen Scannell (8 times) Eugene O'Hare (6 times) Adrian Gillen (3 times)
Tom Clarke (3 times), Michael Holmes (twice), Stephen Gillen (twice) and David Houston (4 times). Some winners have represented Ireland at chess Olympiads and European Team Chess Championship.

Champions

Early Champions
 1892 - E.A. Robinson
 1893 - E.A. Robinson
 1895 - Ernest Louis Harvey
 1897 - William Steen
 1899 - C.E. Smith
 1902 - J. J. O'Hanlon

After 1932 
The Ulster Chess Union was founded in 1932 and relaunched the Ulster Championship.
 1933 - William John Allen
 1934 - W. J. Allen
 1935 - P. J. (Joe) McMahon
 1936 - J. Watson
 1937 - R. Lennox
 1938 - J. D. Peebles
 1939 - William Minnis
 1944 - A. L. Davies
 1945 - William Minnis
 1946 - R.A. Heaney
 1947 - J.D. Peebles
 1949 - J.A. Flood
 1950 - G. A. Kearney
 1951 - W. D. Kerr
 1952 - Robert Jones
 1953 - G. J. Boyd & W. D. Kerr
 1954 - Douglas Eric Arnold Riley
 1955 - R. A. Heaney
 1956 - A. Torney
 1957 - Jack Wrigley
 1958 - G. J. Boyd
 1959 - E. McGlinchey
 1960 - Eugene O'Hare
 1961 - E. O'Hare
 1962 - H. Harte & E. O'Hare
 1963 - E. O'Hare & Edward Whiteside
 1964 - Hugh MacGrillen & E. O'Hare
 1965 - John Larkin Moles & M. O'Leary
 1966 - H. Boyd
 1967 - J. L. Moles
 1968 - M. O'Leary
 1969 - E. O'Hare
 1970 - F. Coll
 1971 - John Nicholson
 1972 - Ray Devenney
 1973 - J. Nicholson
 1974 - Adrain McDaid
 1975 - P. Hadden & D. Harkin
 1976 - J. Nicholson & E. Whiteside
 1977 - J. Nicholson
 1978 - Keith Allen
 1979 - K. Allen
 1980 - K. Allen, John Hegarty, John Kennedy & Derek McGill
 1982 - David Houston & Michael Smyth
 1983 - M. Smyth
 1984 - M. Smyth & Tom Clarke
 1985 - Mark Orr
 1986 - K. Allen
 1987 - Tom Brown & Niall Carton
 1988 - K Allen, D. Houston & M. Orr
 1989 - K. Allen & M. Orr
 1990 - D. Houston
 1991 - Diarmuid Simpson
 1992 - Kieran Greer
 1993 - Adrian Gillen
 1994 - Stephen Gillen & K. Greer
 1995 - S. Gillen & Brian Kelly
 1996 - A. Gillen
 1997 - A. Gillen
 1998 - Michael Holmes & James McDonnell
 1999 - J. McDonnell & Stephen Scannell
 2000 - Timothy Douglas, M. Holmes & S. Scannell

Champions since 2000
 2001 - Stephen Scannell
 2002 - Mark Orr IM
 2003 - Tom Clarke
 2004 - Stephen Scannell
 2005 - Tom Clarke
 2006 - Michael Waters & Stephen Scannell
 2007 - Stephen Scannell
 2008 - Stephen Scannell
 2009 - Stephen Scannell
 2010 - Michael Waters
 2011 - Michael Waters
 2012 - Michael Waters
 2013 - Mike Redman
 2014 - Gábor Horváth
 2015 - Gábor Horváth
 2016 - Stephen Rush (QUB)
 2017 - Stephen Scannell
 2018 - Thomas Donaldson
 2019 - Daniil Zelenchuk
 2020 - no championship due to covid
 2021 - Thomas Donaldson

References

Chess competitions
Chess in Ireland